The House at 1015 Prospect Boulevard is a historic house located at 1015 Prospect Boulevard in Pasadena, California. Built in 1913, the house was likely the first built in Pasadena's Arroyo Park Tract. Architect Sylvanus Marston designed the English-inspired Arts and Crafts house. The two-story house has a stucco exterior with several sets of wood-frame, double-hung windows. A gabled portico with Tudor half-timbered ornamentation covers the front entrance. The multi-component roof has a gable-on-hip main section with a cross gable-on-hip section over the east side; two stucco chimney stacks rise from the roof.

The house was added to the National Register of Historic Places on August 20, 2004. It is also part of the Prospect Historic District, which had previously been listed on the National Register.

References

Houses on the National Register of Historic Places in California
Houses completed in 1913
Buildings and structures on the National Register of Historic Places in Pasadena, California
Houses in Pasadena, California
1913 establishments in California